Pandemis canadana, the green aspen leaftier, is a moth of the  family Tortricidae. The species was first described by William D. Kearfott in 1905. It is found in North America, where it has been recorded from British Columbia to Nova Scotia, south to Colorado, Illinois and Maine. The habitat consists of deciduous forests and shrubs.

The wingspan is 19–20 mm. The ground colour of the forewings varies from light to dark brown with dark brown markings. The basal, median and upper postmedian lines are defined with a pale edge. The hindwings are light to dark grey. Adults are on wing from early July to mid-August.

The larvae feed on various deciduous trees and shrubs.

References

Moths described in 1905
Pandemis